Shubhkaran Choudhary is an Indian politician from the Bharatiya Janata Party and a former member of the Rajasthan Legislative Assembly representing the Udaipurwati Vidhan Sabha constituency of Rajasthan. He is a development oriented MLA.

References 

Living people
Bharatiya Janata Party politicians from Rajasthan
Rajasthan MLAs 2013–2018
1958 births

Indian politicians by party